"Movin' Out (Anthony's Song)" is a song written and recorded by Billy Joel originally appeared on his 1977 album The Stranger. The track details the singer's disgust with the upwardly mobile bourgeois aspirations of working- and lower-middle-class New Yorkers who take pride in working long hours to afford the outward signs of having "made it". Characters have stereotypically ethnic names (Anthony, Mama Leone, Sergeant O'Leary, Mr. Cacciatore) and blue-collar jobs. Joel considers their rejection of their working-class roots (trading a Chevy for a Cadillac and buying a house in Hackensack, New Jersey) ultimately futile. Near the end of the recording is the sound of a car starting up and driving away; the bass player Doug Stegmeyer's 1960s Corvette was used.

According to Joel, Anthony is not a real person, but rather "every Irish, Polish, and Italian kid trying to make a living in the U.S."

Live performances of the song can be heard on 2000 Years: The Millennium Concert and 12 Gardens Live.

Reception
Billboard described "Movin' Out" as an "upbeat narrative that is sort of a commentary on upward mobility."  Cash Box said that "growling cellos and a pulsating rhythm section set the mood for Joel's threatening indictment of middle-class values" and that it has "one of the best choruses he has written in some time, combined with unusual echo effects, a yapping horn section, and a melodic guitar finale that wraps it all up nicely." Record World said it is "a typically expressive Joel song, with New York references and an unusual, piano-dominated structure."

Versions
The 45RPM single slightly differs from the album version as the sound effects of the car near the end of the song were removed.  The single was originally released in the Fall of 1977, but was pulled when Joel's previous single started climbing the charts.  It was re-released in March 1978.

Personnel
Billy Joel – lead and backing vocals, piano
Steve Khan and Hiram Bullock – electric guitars
Richie Cannata – saxophones
Doug Stegmeyer – bass guitar
Liberty DeVitto – drums

Broadway musical

The Twyla Tharp Broadway dance musical Movin' Out, featuring the songs of Billy Joel, opened at the Richard Rodgers Theatre in New York City on October 24, 2002, and played 1,307 performances before closing in December 2005. The show's lead piano player and singer was Michael Cavanaugh. It toured the US extensively from 2004 to 2007, with Darren Holden as lead Piano Man, and Matt Wilson, James Fox and Matthew Friedman as second Piano Men. The show transferred to the Apollo Victoria Theatre in the West End of London on April 10, 2006; James Fox played lead piano and sang, with Darren Reeves as second piano man. It closed early, on May 22, owing to poor ticket sales.

Movin' Out is also the title of the original Broadway cast album taken from the musical.

Track listing
Europe
 "Movin' Out (Anthony's Song)" – time: 3:28
 "She's Always A Woman" – time: 3:21

UK
 "Movin' Out (Anthony's Song)" – time: 3:28
 "Vienna" – time: 3:34

United States
 "Movin' Out (Anthony's Song)" – time: 3:28
 "Everybody Has A Dream" – time: 4:36

Charts

Weekly charts

Year-end charts

Certifications

References

External links
Billy Joel official website
 

1977 singles
1978 singles
Billy Joel songs
Songs written by Billy Joel
Song recordings produced by Phil Ramone
Columbia Records singles
1977 songs